was a Japanese sprinter. He competed in the men's 400 metres at the 1936 Summer Olympics.

References

External links
 

1913 births
Year of death uncertain
Athletes (track and field) at the 1936 Summer Olympics
Japanese male sprinters
Olympic athletes of Japan
Place of birth missing
20th-century Japanese people